William Henry Lucky, Jr. (August 24, 1931 – January 9, 2012) was an American football defensive tackle.  He played professionally in the National Football League (NFL) for one season, 1955, with the Green Bay Packers.  Lucky played college football for Baylor University before being drafted by the Cleveland Browns in the fifth round of the 1954 NFL Draft.

References

1931 births
2012 deaths
People from Rosenberg, Texas
People from Bell County, Texas
Players of American football from Texas
American football defensive tackles
Baylor Bears football players
Green Bay Packers players